in Japan are established by the Ministry of the Environment and, for areas of more local importance, by the Prefectural Governments in order "to protect and promote the reproduction of birds and mammals" in accordance with the 2002  (superseding the amended 1918 Law). The areas established have a maximum duration of twenty years (subject to renewal) and hunting is prohibited within them.  are designated within the Wildlife Protection Areas in order to protect habitats and ecosystems.

Classification of wildlife
The wildlife of Japan is classified either as game species or protected species. The former includes thirty species of bird and seventeen of mammal that are considered (1) able to withstand hunting (2) harmful to agriculture and forestry (3) useful for meat or other derivatives. These species include the brown bear, black bear, Japanese deer, Japanese hare, Japanese quail, and Japanese pheasant. Over six hundred species are protected. Insectivorous mammals and rats are excluded from protection since they are considered harmful to agriculture; some marine mammals fall under the alternative jurisdiction of the Ministry of Agriculture, Forestry and Fisheries. While the number of animals hunted is falling with the decline in the number of hunters, the number of birds and mammals "controlled" is rising in relation to damage to crops.

Established Wildlife Protection Areas

Complementary measures
Wildlife Protection Areas are just one element in a network of complementary protected area systems. Others include Wilderness Areas and Nature Conservation Areas under the Nature Conservation Law; Natural Parks under the Natural Parks Law; Natural Habitat Conservation Areas under the Law for the Conservation of Endangered Species of Wild Fauna and Flora; Natural Monuments and Special Natural Monuments under the Law for the Protection of Cultural Properties 1950; Protected Forests under the National Forest Management Bylaw; and Protected Waters under the Preservation of Fisheries Resources Law. Areas are also  protected in accordance with three international programmes: the World Heritage Convention (see Yakushima, Shirakami-Sanchi, Shiretoko, and Ogasawara Islands); Man and the Biosphere Programme (see Yakushima, Mount Ōmine/Mount Ōdaigahara, Hakusan, and Shiga Kōgen); and the Ramsar Convention (see Ramsar Sites in Japan).

See also
 Wildlife of Japan
 National Parks of Japan
 Environmental issues in Japan

References

External links
 Protected areas in Japan (Ministry of the Environment)
 Overview of wildlife protection in Japan (Ministry of the Environment)
 Map of all 86 Wildlife Protection Areas (Ministry of the Environment)
  Wildlife protection in Japan (Ministry of the Environment)

Protected areas of Japan

ja:鳥獣保護区